Every Grain of Sand is a tribute album to Bob Dylan recorded by Barb Jungr. The album is named after a Dylan song of the same name.

Track listing 
"I'll Be Your Baby Tonight" (Bob Dylan) – 4:06
Originally from the Bob Dylan album John Wesley Harding (1967)
"If Not For You" (Dylan) – 3:09
Originally from the Bob Dylan album New Morning (1970)
"Things Have Changed" (Dylan) – 4:57
Originally from the soundtrack to the film Wonder Boys (dir Curtis Hanson) (2000), and from the Bob Dylan album The Essential Bob Dylan (2000)
"Ring Them Bells" (Dylan) – 3:14
Originally from the Bob Dylan album Oh Mercy (1989)
"Not Dark Yet" (Dylan) – 4:36
Originally from the Bob Dylan album Time Out of Mind (1997)
"Don't Think Twice, It's All Right" (Dylan) – 4:37
Originally from the Bob Dylan album The Freewheelin' Bob Dylan (1963)
"Is Your Love in Vain?" (Dylan) – 3:29
Originally from the Bob Dylan album Street Legal (1978)
"It's All Over Now, Baby Blue" (Dylan) – 4:10
Originally from the Bob Dylan album Bringing It All Back Home (1965)
"I Want You" (Dylan) – 3:13
Originally from the Bob Dylan album Blonde on Blonde (1966)
"Sugar Baby" (Dylan) – 7:40
Originally from the Bob Dylan album Love and Theft (2001)
"Born in Time" (Dylan) – 3:10
Originally from the Bob Dylan album Under the Red Sky (1990)
"What Good Am I?" (Dylan) – 3:58
Originally from the Bob Dylan album Oh Mercy (1989)
"Tangled Up in Blue" (Dylan) – 5:33
Originally from the Bob Dylan album Blood on the Tracks (1975)
"Forever Young" (Dylan) – 2:57
Originally from the Bob Dylan album Planet Waves (1974)
"Every Grain of Sand" (Dylan) – 4:22
Originally from the Bob Dylan album Shot of Love (1981)

Personnel

Musicians 
Barb Jungr - vocals, harmonica
Simon Wallace - piano (tracks 1-3, 5-8, 10-12, 14-15)
Russell Churney - piano (tracks 4, 9, 13)
Mark Lockheart - saxophone
Kim Burton - accordion
Sonya Fairbairn - violin
Sonia Oakes Stuart - (Sonia Hammond) cello
Julie Walkington - double bass
Gary Hammond - percussion

Other personnel 
Calum Malcolm - engineer
Kevan Gallagher - engineer
John Haxby - design
Garry Laybourn - photography
Eric Thorburn - photography
Brodie - make-up
Howard Thompson - artists and repertoire

See also
List of songs written by Bob Dylan
List of artists who have covered Bob Dylan songs

References

External links 
Every Grain of Sand: Barb Jungr Sings Bob Dylan official website

Barb Jungr albums
Bob Dylan tribute albums
2002 albums
Linn Records albums